Copeland, Oklahoma may refer to:

Copeland, a post office established in Atoka County
Copeland, a census-designated place in Delaware County, Oklahoma